Donald Perry (1890 – death date unknown) was an American Negro league first baseman between 1918 and 1922.

A native of North Carolina, Perry made his Negro leagues debut in 1918 with the Philadelphia Giants, and went on to play for the Harrisburg Giants in 1922.

References

External links
 and Seamheads

1890 births
Year of death missing
Date of birth missing
Place of birth missing
Place of death missing
Harrisburg Giants players
Philadelphia Giants players
Baseball first basemen
Baseball players from North Carolina